Michael Paul Brey (born March 22, 1959) is an American basketball coach. He was recently men's head coach at the University of Notre Dame.

Early life and education
Brey, the son of Olympic swimmer Betty Brey, graduated from DeMatha Catholic High School in Hyattsville, Maryland in 1977. As a two-year letter winner under coach Morgan Wootten, Brey helped the team to a 55–9 mark. He enrolled at Northwestern State University, where he played varsity basketball for three years (1977–1980). He played one season at George Washington in 1981–82 after sitting out the 1980–81 season as a transfer. He served as team captain and was named most valuable player with 5.0 points and 4.8 rebounds per game for the Colonials. In 1982 Brey graduated from George Washington University with a bachelor's degree in physical education.

Coaching career
Brey returned to his former high school, becoming an assistant coach under Morgan Wootten. In 1987, he was hired by Duke University to assist Mike Krzyzewski, and in 1995 he took over his first head coaching job at the University of Delaware. Brey guided the Fightin' Blue Hens to a 99–51 record over five years, leading the team to two America East Conference Championships and subsequently two trips to the NCAA Tournament. In 2000, Brey became the head coach at the University of Notre Dame.

Notre Dame Fighting Irish
In 2000, Brey succeeded Matt Doherty as head coach of the Notre Dame Fighting Irish men's basketball team. Notre Dame had not been to the NCAA tournament since 1990. Brey led the Irish to the NCAA tournament in his first three years as head coach (2001–2003), notching a Sweet Sixteen appearance in 2003. He has since led the team to tournament appearances in 2007, 2008, 2010, 2011, 2012, 2013, 2015, 2016, and 2017.

On December 29, 2017, Brey tied Digger Phelps for most wins by a Notre Dame coach with 393.

2007–08 season
During the 2007–08 season, Brey led the Irish to a 24–6 regular-season mark. He was named the Big East Coach of the Year for the second consecutive season on March 11, 2008. Notre Dame had a 45-game home winning streak between February 2006 and February 2009 – the second-longest in school history. By completing the 2007–2008 regular season 18–0 at home, Brey coached the first team in Big East history to have consecutive undefeated seasons at home.

On June 19, 2012, Brey signed a 10-year extension to remain the head coach of the Notre Dame Irish up until 2022. The financials were not released.

2014–15 season
During the 2014–15 season, Brey's Notre Dame team went 32–6 and won the ACC conference tournament. The squad advanced to the Elite Eight, losing a close game to Kentucky.  The 32 wins were the most by a Notre Dame men's team since 1908–09.  He also passed Hall of Famer George Keogan for second place on Notre Dame's all-time wins list, trailing only Digger Phelps.

2015–16 season
Notre Dame advanced to the Elite Eight for the second consecutive season, defeating Michigan, Stephen F. Austin, and Wisconsin as the 6 seed in the East region. Notre Dame lost to North Carolina 88–74 in the Elite Eight.

2016–17 season
During the 2016–17 regular season, Brey's team went 23–8.  They finished the season in a three-way tie with Florida State and Louisville.  The Irish were given a 3-seed in the ACC tournament which guaranteed them a double bye.  Notre Dame dominated its first two games against Virginia and Florida State and sparked another ACC tournament final appearance for the second time in three years.  The Irish went on to lose in the tournament final to Duke, 75–69. Notre Dame received a 5-seed in the West Region of the NCAA tournament, and defeated Princeton in the first round before falling to West Virginia in the second round.

Resignation from Notre Dame
With his 2022-23 struggling to stay out of basement of the ACC standings, on January 19, 2023, Brey announced that the 2022-23 season would be his last as head coach at Notre Dame, although he said that he was definitely not done coaching.

Head coaching record

References

External links
 Notre Dame Fighting Irish profile

1959 births
Living people
American men's basketball coaches
American men's basketball players
Basketball coaches from Maryland
Basketball players from Maryland
College men's basketball head coaches in the United States
Delaware Fightin' Blue Hens men's basketball coaches
DeMatha Catholic High School alumni
Duke Blue Devils men's basketball coaches
George Washington Colonials men's basketball players
High school basketball coaches in Maryland
Northwestern State Demons basketball players
Notre Dame Fighting Irish men's basketball coaches
People from Bethesda, Maryland
Sportspeople from Montgomery County, Maryland